Happily Divorced is an American sitcom created for TV Land by Fran Drescher and Peter Marc Jacobson, based upon their own real-life experiences. It is TV Land's third sitcom after Hot in Cleveland and Retired at 35. Fran Drescher stars as Fran, a Los Angeles florist who finds out her husband Peter (John Michael Higgins), to whom she has been married for eighteen years, is gay. Naturally, they get a divorce but, because of their tight financial situation, they continue to live in the same house together. The series is based on Drescher and Jacobson's real-life divorce and his eventual coming out. The series ran from June 15, 2011 to February 13, 2013. On August 23, 2013, TV Land cancelled the series after two seasons. A total of thirty-four episodes were produced and aired.

Series overview
{| class="wikitable" style="text-align:center"
|-
! style="padding: 0 8px;" colspan="2" rowspan="2"| Season
!! style="padding: 0 8px;" rowspan="2"| Episodes
!! colspan="2"| Originally aired
|-
! style="padding: 0 8px;"| First aired
! style="padding: 0 8px;"| Last aired
|-
| style="background-color: #AC1D00; color: #100; text-align: center; top" | 
| 1
| 10
| style="padding: 0 8px;"| 
| 
|-
| style="background-color: #3599FD; color: #100; text-align: center; top" | 
| 2
| 24
| 
| style="padding: 0 8px;"| 
|}

Episodes

Season 1 (2011)

Season 2 (2012–13)

References

External links
 
 

Lists of American sitcom episodes